Sudakshina was a king of the Kambojas and is featured in the Indian epic the Mahabharata.

On the 14th day of battle, Arjuna, with his charioteer Krishna, attempts to reach Jayadratha. Dronacharya and Duryodhana arrange warriors in Arjuna's path, trying to impede his progress until sunset. Sudakhina rallies a fleeing Kaurava akshauhini, challenging Arjuna. He throws a spear at Arjuna; the spear connects and Arjuna swoons in his seat, dripping blood. The Kaurava army begins to cheer, thinking Arjuna is dead. However, Arjuna quickly recovers and angrily invokes the Indrastra, which multiplies into many arrows and decimates the Kaurava forces. Sudakshina falls to one of these arrows.

It is later remarked that while Sudakshina was a just and good monarch, he felt obligated to fight for Duryodhana. In the years preceding the war, Karna had conquered the Kamboja army and Sudakshina had bent the knee to Hastinapur. Despite knowing that the Pandavas had dharma on their side, he raised his banners for Duryodhana.

See also
Srindra Varmana Kamboj
Chandravarma
Kamatha
Kurukshetra war

References

 Characters in the Mahabharata
 Kambojas